"Scream" is a song by American heavy metal band Avenged Sevenfold. It was released as the fifth and final single from their self-titled fourth studio album. The song reached number nine on the U.S. Hot Mainstream Rock Tracks chart and number 26 on the U.S. Alternative Songs chart.

"Scream" was released on July 27, 2010 as a downloadable track in Rock Band 2 along with "Nightmare" and "Seize the Day".

Music video 
On October 31, 2008, Avenged Sevenfold mentioned that fans of the band were eligible to make their own music video for the song. The video had to be submitted to YouTube before November 30, 2008. The winner and five runners-up of the contest were announced on December 15, 2008. The winner received a new MacBook Air computer that came with Avenged Sevenfold videos, music, and other items from the band. The winning video was also featured on the Avenged Sevenfold website, MySpace page, YouTube account, and Facebook account. The five runners-up in this contest received a copy of the DVD and CD Live in the LBC & Diamonds in the Rough, signed by the members of the band; in addition, a merchandise pack was also rewarded to these runners-up.

Charts

Personnel
Avenged Sevenfold
M. Shadows – lead vocals, backing vocals
Zacky Vengeance – rhythm guitar, backing vocals
The Rev - drums, co-lead vocals, percussion, piano, backing vocals
Synyster Gates – lead guitar, backing vocals
Johnny Christ – bass guitar, backing vocals

Session musicians
Scream by Valary Sanders
Production
Produced by Avenged Sevenfold
Engineered by Fred Archambault and Dave Schiffman, assisted by Clifton Allen, Chris Steffen, Robert DeLong, Aaron Walk, Mike Scielzi, and Josh Wilbur
Mixed by Andy Wallace
Mastered by Brian Gardner
Drum tech by Mike Fasano
Guitar tech by Walter Rice
'Fan Producers for a Day' (MVI) by Daniel McLaughlin and Christopher Guinn

References 

Avenged Sevenfold songs
2008 singles
Warner Records singles
2007 songs
Alternative metal songs
Groove metal songs